White Mischief (1987), directed by Michael Radford, dramatises the events of the Happy Valley murder case in Kenya in 1941, wherein Sir Henry “Jock” Delves Broughton was tried for the murder of Josslyn Hay, 22nd Earl of Erroll. The film is based upon the novel White Mischief: The Murder of Lord Erroll (1982), by James Fox, which originated from a newspaper article published in 1969. The cast of White Mischief features Greta Scacchi, Charles Dance, and Joss Ackland, Sarah Miles, Geraldine Chaplin, and Ray McAnally, Murray Head, John Hurt, and Trevor Howard.

Plot
Throughout the Second World War, aristocrats in the Kenya Colony's Happy Valley region often led hedonistic lifestyles of indulgence in alcohol, drugs, and extramarital relationships.  On 24 January 1941, Josslyn Hay, the philandering Earl of Erroll, was found dead in his car in a secluded area, with his reputation for adulterous relationships preceding him.

One such married woman is Diana Delves Broughton, the beautiful wife of Sir John Henry Delves Broughton, known as "Jock", who is thirty years her senior, with whom she has a pre-nuptial understanding that, should either of them fall in love with someone else, the other party would not impede that romance.

Diana has indeed succumbed to the charms of the roguish Earl of Erroll, whose other lovers include the drug-addicted American heiress Alice de Janzé and the more reserved Nina Soames. The Earl is more serious about this affair than any of his earlier dalliances, and wants Diana to marry him. She is reluctant to leave what she thinks is the financial security of her marriage to formalise her relationship with Erroll (who has no funds or prospects), unaware that her husband is deep in debt. Privately humiliated but appearing to honour their agreement, Delves Broughton publicly toasts the couple's affair at the club in Nairobi, asking Erroll to bring Diana home at a specified time. Delves Broughton appears to be extremely intoxicated for the rest of the evening; once he is alone it is clear he was feigning drunkenness. After dropping off Diana, Erroll is shot dead in his car near the home of Delves Broughton, who is soon charged with the murder.

Diana is distraught over losing her lover, as is Alice, who openly masturbates next to his corpse at the mortuary. A local plantation owner, Gilbert Colvile, whose only friend is Delves Broughton, quietly offers Diana advice and solace and ultimately shocks her by proposing marriage.

Delves Broughton stands trial. There are no witnesses to the crime and the physical evidence that appears incriminating is also circumstantial. He obviously had the motive and means, but is found innocent, and the scandal comes to an end. De Janzé ultimately kills herself, and Diana discovers further evidence that implicates her husband in her lover's death. After killing their dog and then menacing her with a shotgun, Broughton shoots himself in front of her. The film ends with a fleeing, bloodstained Diana discovering the remaining Happy Valley set partying around de Janzé's grave.

Cast
 Greta Scacchi as Diana Broughton
 Joss Ackland as Sir Henry "Jock" Delves Broughton, 11th Baronet
 Charles Dance as Josslyn Hay, Earl of Erroll
 Sarah Miles as Alice de Janzé
 Geraldine Chaplin as Nina Soames
 Ray McAnally as Morris
 Murray Head as Lizzie
 John Hurt as Gilbert Colvile
 Trevor Howard as Jack Soames
 Susan Fleetwood as Gwladys Delamere
 Catherine Neilson as June Carbery
 Hugh Grant as Hugh Dickinson
 Alan Dobie as Sir Walter Harragin
 Jacqueline Pearce as Idina Soltau
Richard Attenborough was offered the lead but turned it down because he wanted to focus on his direction.

Production
In 1969 James Fox and Cyril Connolly began investigating the case for an article in The Sunday Times called "Christmas at Karen". When Connolly died in 1974 Fox inherited his notes and theories, and returned to Kenya to undertake further research. The result was the book White Mischief, published in 1982. The title came from Black Mischief, Evelyn Waugh's satirical novel set in the mythical African kingdom of Azania. The New York Times called it "a fascinating book." The Boston Globe said "had ‘White Mischief’ been a work of fiction it would have required the collaboration of Agatha Christie and P. G. Wodehouse." While researching the book Fox also collected information about Beryl Markham, which was turned into the film A Shadow on the Sun.

Film rights were optioned by Michael White, a friend of Fox's, while the book was being written.

The film was directed by Michael Radford, who co-wrote the script with British playwright Jonathan Gems, who had never worked on a film before. "Films of Africa should be made by Africans," said Radford. "This is a film of melancholy about people who have everything and yet have nothing. It's about people who want to possess what they can't possess."

Obtaining funding for the film proved difficult. Money came from a chain of Canadian cinemas, Cineplex Odeon, Goldcrest Films and Nelson Entertainment. The balance came from Columbia Pictures, then under David Puttnam as head of production.

Filming took place from February to May 1987 at Shepperton Studios and on location in Kenya. Wrotham Park was used as Doddington Hall, the home of Delves Broughton.

Historical accuracy
De Janzé actually shot herself on 30 September 1941, while Delves Broughton eventually returned to England and committed suicide by morphine overdose in the Adelphi Hotel in Liverpool in December 1942, over a year later.

"There is a difference between fact and truth," said producer Simon Perry. "You can be truthful without being factual. It's inevitable there will be people who think Kenya was and still is a paradise of remittance men and black sheep of aristocratic families. Kenya was an exaggerated microcosm of society in Britain at that time, painted in primary colours with characters larger than life."

Sir Jock Broughton's son, Sir Evelyn, complained that the film depicted his father as a murderer. He said his father was too drunk that night to have committed the crime and that Diana was more likely to have done it.

Diana Broughton died in 1987.

Reception

Box office
The film made a loss during its theatrical release. However, Jake Eberts reported that Goldcrest Films invested £1,300,000 in the film, and received £1,633,000, earning them a profit of £333,000.

Fox said he was "ambivalent" about the movie, based on his book.

Legacy
In 1996, Mariette Bosch murdered Ria Wolmerans in Botswana. Both women were white South Africans. The case was referred to as "Botswana's white mischief".

See also

The Happy Valley, a BBC television drama also dealing with the murder, was first aired on 6 September 1987, several months before White Mischief was released.

References

External links
 
 
 
 White Mischief review in cosmopolis.ch

1987 films
1980s historical drama films
British biographical drama films
British historical drama films
British legal films
British courtroom films
Columbia Pictures films
Films based on British novels
Films scored by George Fenton
Films directed by Michael Radford
Films set in 1941
Films set in Kenya
Films set in the British Empire
Films shot in Kenya
Goldcrest Films films
1980s English-language films
1980s British films